KinnPorsche: The Series is a 2022 Thai action romance drama television series based on a web novel of the same name by writing duo Daemi. It stars Phakphum Romsaithong (Mile) as Kinn and Nattawin Wattanagitiphat (Apo) as Porsche. The series follows Porsche, desperate to make money and take care of his younger brother, as he finds himself drawn into the mafia underworld by Kinn.

The series is directed by Kongkiat Komesiri (Khom), Krisda Witthayakhajorndet (Pond), and Banchorn Vorasataree (Pepsi). It premiered in Thailand on One 31 on 2 April 2022, airing every Saturday at 23:00 ICT, while it was distributed in Japan through U-Next and worldwide on iQIYI. The full uncut version, called KinnPorsche: La Forte aired one hour later on iQIYI.

Synopsis 
Kinn Anakinn Theerapanyakun, the second son and de facto heir of the Theerapanyakun crime family, is attacked on his way home from making a business deal. While running for his life, he stumbles across Porsche Pachara Kittisawasd, a local bartender and underground fighter. Kinn pays Porsche to protect him from the men trying to kill him. Impressed by Porsche's fighting abilities, Kinn tracks him down to offer him a job.

In order to make enough money to send his younger brother Porchay to university, and to keep the house that had belonged to their dead parents, Porsche reluctantly agrees to become Kinn's full-time bodyguard. Over the next few months, he improves his fighting skills and learns about the dark underworld he now belongs to, but also begins to fall in love with his charismatic boss.

Even though Kinn is unashamedly gay, the path ahead isn't easy for the two lovers. The minor branch of the family, ruled by Kinn's uncle, is desperate to take control. His father is in poor health, his older brother is a PTSD-stricken mess, his younger brother is a rising star, and Vegas, his cousin from the minor family is also becoming a rising threat to him; also the mystery of Porsche's parents' untimely death seems somehow tied to the Theerapanyakun family.

Cast and characters

Main 
 Phakphum Romsaithong (Mile) as Kinn Anakinn Theerapanyakun, the second son and heir presumptive to the Theerapanyakun crime family's main branch.
 Nattawin Wattanagitiphat (Apo) as Porsche Pachara Kittisawasd, local bartender and underground fighter.
 Pasin Cahanding as young Porsche

Supporting 
 Wichapas Sumettikul (Bible) as Vegas Kornwit Theerapanyakun, the eldest son and the heir apparent of the Theerapanyakun crime family's secondary branch.
 Jakapan Puttha (Build) as Pete Phongsakorn Saengtham, Tankhun's head bodyguard and Porsche's roommate at the Theerapanyakun compound.
 Jeff Satur as Kim Kimhan Theerapanyakun, Kinn's pop star younger brother who feigns disinterest in the family business, but is secretly just as ruthless as his father and brother.
 Tinnasit Isarapongporn (Barcode) as Porchay Pitchaya Kittisawasd, Porsche's younger brother who is trying to get into a prestigious music program at university.

Recurring

People around Porsche 
 Patteerat Laemluang (Sprite) as Yok, the owner of HUM bar, where Porsche was her star bartender.
 Touchchavit Kulkranchang (Ping) as Jom, Porsche's friend.
 Pongsakorn Ponsantigul (Pong) as Tem, Porsche's friend.
 Thanavate Siriwattanagul (Gap) as Arthee, Porsche and Porschay's uncle with a gambling addiction.
 Sarucha Phongsongkul (Annita) as Namphueng Kittisawasd, Porsche and Porchay's mother.

People around Kinn 
 Nititorn Akkarachotsopon (Us) as Tay, Kinn's friend who is in a relationship with Time.
 Chalach Tantijibul (JJ) as Time, Kinn's friend who is in a relationship with Tay.
 Nutthasid Panyagarm (Notd) as Big, Kinn's bodyguard who is later reassigned to Kim.
 Nakhun Screaigh (Perth) as Ken, Kinn's bodyguard.
 Naphat Vikairungroj (Na) as Tawan, Kinn's ex-boyfriend.

Theerapanyakun main family 
 Songsit Roongnophakunsri (Kob) as Korn Theerapanyakun, Kinn's father and head of the Theerapanyakun family. Kun's older brother. 
 Thanayut Thakoon-auttaya (Tong) as Tankhun Theerapanyakun, Kinn's eccentric older brother who suffers from PTSD and no longer wants to rule the family.
 Asavapatr Ponpiboon (Bas) as Arm, Tankhun's bodyguard and the most tech-savvy of the Theerapanyakun bodyguards.
 Yosatorn Konglikit (Job) as Pol, one of Tankhun's bodyguards.
 Peter Knight as Chan, Korn's bodyguard and the leader of all the Theerapanyakun bodyguards.

Theerapanyakun minor family  
 Piya Vimuktayon (Ex) as Kun Theerapanyakun, Korn's younger brother and Kinn's uncle who is at odds with the main family branch. Father of Vegas and Macau.
 Nannakun Pakapatpornpob (Ta) as Macau Theerapanyakun, the second and youngest son of the Theerapanyakun crime family's secondary branch.

Production 
In September 2020, production company Filmania announced the web-novel KinnPorsche Story: Fierce Love, Finally Love would be adapted into a television series. After releasing a teaser trailer in January 2021, Filmania held a press conference and traditional worship ceremony to kick off the beginning of the project in March.

In early July 2021, at filming almost completed, the writing duo Daemi of the original web-novel announced their departure from Filmania due to creative differences. Seeing the potential of the series and the efforts put in by the rest of the cast, actor Phakphum Romsaithong, who had been cast for the main role of Kinn, contacted his friend and director Krisda Witthayakhajorndet, who was also an executive at the production company Be On Cloud. KinnPorsche was subsequently picked up by Be On Cloud, which announced it would have undergone some changes. In late August 2021, the new production company released a new teaser and the series title was shortened to KinnPorsche: The Series. In November 2021, a press conference was held where the new cast was officially confirmed and a collaboration with rock band Slot Machine was announced. Also in November, it was announced that KinnPorsche would be iQIYI's first Thai original series.

In March 2022 it was announced that iQIYI would release the uncut version, called KinnPorsche: La Forte.

Romsaithong decided to appear in the series because he thought the gangster theme had a lot of potential and to experience something new, while Wattanagitiphat to challenge a different series than soap operas.

Episodes

Original soundtrack 

For the soundtrack, KinnPorsche partnered with Slot Machine and composer Therdsak Chanpan. The Thai rock band sang two songs for the series, namely "PhiangWaichai" and its English version "Free Fall", both produced by Thitiwat Rongthong of The Darkest Romance. The series' soundtrack also features "Why Don't You Stay" (แค่เธอ) by Jeff Satur, "This Song is Called You" (เพลงนี้ชื่อว่าเธอ) by Barcode Tinnasit Isarapongporn, and "Controversy" (ย้อนแย้ง) by Aek Season Five.

World tour 
On 1 June 2022, Be On Cloud announced that there would be a KinnPorsche World Tour in collaboration with Live Nation Asia involving 16 of the series' cast members and the band Slot Machine.

The world tour debut on 24 and 25 July at the Impact Arena in Bangkok saw two sold-out shows with more than 20,000 fans in attendance, and included exclusive appearances from cast members who did not sign up for the rest of the tour. The Asian leg of the tour took place between September and October of the same year in Singapore (The Star Theatre, 8 October), Seoul (KBS Arena, 16 October), Manila (SM Mall of Asia, 22 October), and Taipei (Taipei International Convention Centre, 30 October). A Vietnamese stop, originally scheduled for 28 October at the Phu Tho Indoor Stadium in Ho Chi Minh City, was postponed on 22 September and then announced for 11 February 2023 at Saigon Exhibition and Convention Center (SECC). It was once again canceled on 6 February due to threats against the actors. The tour will hold its final show in Bangkok on 25 February.

Throughout the tour, Be On Cloud uploaded Behind the Show videos to their YouTube channel, which documented the cast's experience of preparing for and putting on the show at each tour stop.

Reception 
Upon release, KinnPorsche trended worldwide on YouTube, Instagram and Twitter after each episode, with the two main actors gaining million of followers and global stardom. The first episode topped iQIYI streaming charts in 191 territories.

Rolling Stone India noted the dark, vicious and explicit atmosphere, praising the cast's chemistry and performances. Some dubbed it as the Euphoria of the BL world, and it was also praised for its action theme. It was featured on Teen Vogue's best BL dramas of 2022 list for being "a thrilling, lush and gargantuan tale of love and sin."

Viewership 
In the table below,  represents the lowest ratings and  represents the highest ratings.

 Based on the average audience share per episode.

Awards and nominations

References

External links 
 KinnPorsche The Series La Forte on iQIYI
 

2020s LGBT-related drama television series
2022 Thai television series debuts
Fictional LGBT couples
IQIYI original programming
Thai boys' love television series
Thai action television series